Events from the year 1885 in art.

Events
 March 24 [O.S.] – Peter Carl Fabergé presents the first imperial Fabergé egg to Maria Feodorovna, wife of Alexander III of Russia, beginning an Easter tradition that continues until 1917.
 May 20 – A letter, "A Woman's Plea", published in The Times of London protests against the use of nude models in art. Signed "British Matron" it is in fact written by painter and senior Royal Academician John Callcott Horsley.
 June – Paul Gauguin returns to Paris from Copenhagen where he has been unsuccessful in reconciling with his wife.
 July 13 – New building for the Rijksmuseum in Amsterdam, designed by Pierre Cuypers, opens.
 August – First public display of works by Vincent van Gogh, in the windows of the art dealer Leurs at The Hague.
 "Glasgow Boys" first exhibit collectively, at the Glasgow Institute of the Fine Arts.
 Aberdeen Art Gallery opens in Scotland.
 Birmingham Museum and Art Gallery opens in England.
 The Guildhall Art Gallery opens in the City of London.
 The E. B. Crocker Art Gallery is presented to the people of Sacramento, California.
 The Opponenterna, a group of Swedish artists, demands that the Royal Swedish Academy of Fine Arts be modernized.

Awards
 June 26 – John Everett Millais granted a baronetcy in the United Kingdom, the first artist to accept a hereditary title (G. F. Watts refuses for a second time).

Works

 Lawrence Alma-Tadema – A Reading from Homer
 Michael Ancher – Vil han klare pynten ("Will he Round the Point?")
 William-Adolphe Bouguereau – The Young Shepherdess
 Frank Bramley
 Everyone His Own Tale
 Primrose Day
 Ernest Christophe – La Fatalité (sculpture)
 Albert Dubois-Pillet (some dates approximate)
 Ankerplaats
 Bouquet of Roses in a Vase
 Landscape with a Lock
 Still Life with Fish
 View of Paris
 Winter Landscape
 Thomas Eakins – The Swimming Hole
 Albert Edelfelt – Portrait of Louis Pasteur
 Henri Fantin-Latour – Around the Piano
 Luke Fildes – Venetians
 Stanhope Forbes – A Fish Sale on a Cornish Beach
 Paul Gauguin
 Self-portrait (Kimbell Art Museum, Fort Worth)
 Women Bathing (Baigneuses à Dieppe)
 Jean-Léon Gérôme – The great bath of Brousse
 Ellen Day Hale – Self-portrait (Museum of Fine Arts, Boston)
 Winslow Homer – The Fog Warning (Museum of Fine Arts, Boston)
 Juan Luna
 Chula series
 Odalisque Jan Matejko – Bohdan Khmelnytsky with Tuhaj Bej near Lviv John Everett Millais – The Ruling Passion Charles William Mitchell – Hypatia Claude Monet -Meadow with Haystacks near GivernyThe Cliffs at Etretat Henri-Paul Motte – The Fiancee of Belus Walter Osborne – Feeding the Chickens Anna Palm – A game of l'hombre in Brøndums Hotel Pierre-Auguste Renoir – Girl Braiding Her Hair (Suzanne Valadon) Ilya Repin – Ivan the Terrible and His Son Ivan, 16 November 1581 (Tretyakov Gallery, Moscow)
 Tom Roberts – Winter morning after rain, Gardiner's Creek (Art Gallery of South Australia)
 John Singer Sargent
 Claude Monet Painting by the Edge of a Wood Judith Gautier Robert Louis Stevenson and his wife Therese Schwartze – Three girls from the Amsterdam Orphanage Marie Spartali Stillman – Love's Messenger Marianne Stokes – Homeless James Tissot
 The Bridesmaid The Shop Girl William Greene Turner – Oliver Perry Monument (bronze, Newport, Rhode Island)
 Vincent van Gogh
 The Potato Eaters (April)
 Cottages series
 Old Church Tower at Nuenen series (continued)
 Peasant Character Studies Still life paintings (continuing)
 Two Paintings of Amsterdam (October)
 Hubert von Herkomer – Hard Times John William Waterhouse – Saint Eulalia George Frederic Watts
 Love and Life Mammon The Minotaur W. L. Wyllie
 A Dying Giant Storm and Sunshine: A Battle with the ElementsBirths
 January 21 – Duncan Grant, Scottish painter (died 1978)
 February 18 – Henri Laurens, French sculptor (died 1954)
 February 24 – Stanisław Ignacy Witkiewicz ('Witkacy'), Polish painter, playwright and novelist (suicide 1939)
 March 3 – Cecil Thomas, English bronze sculptor and medallist (died 1976)
 March 31 – Pascin, Bulgarian-born painter and draftsman (suicide 1930)
 April 4 – Leonardo Dudreville, Italian painter (died 1975)
 April 8 – Norman Clyde, American mountaineer, nature photographer and naturalist (died 1972)
 April 12 – Robert Delaunay, French painter (died 1941)
 May 8 – Charles Walter Simpson, English painter of nature and teacher (died 1971)
 May 9 – Gianni Vella, Maltese painter and cartoonist (died 1977)
 May 12 – Mario Sironi, Italian painter (died 1961)
 June 27 – Arthur Lismer, English-born Canadian painter, member of the Group of Seven (died 1969)
 July 5 – André Lhote, French painter and sculptor (died 1962)
 July 11 – Roger de La Fresnaye, French cubist painter (died 1925)
 July 15 – Josef Frank, Austrian-born architect and designer (died 1967)
 August 15 – Nancy Cox-McCormack, American portrait sculptor (died 1967)
 August 26 – Gwen Raverat, née Darwin, English wood engraver (died 1957)
 August 30 – Paul Gösch, German artist and architect (died 1940)
 September 9 – Clare Sheridan, English sculptor and author (died 1970)
 September 12 – Heinrich Hoffmann, German propaganda photographer (died 1957)
 October 15 – Jóhannes Sveinsson Kjarval, Icelandic painter (died 1972)
 October 21 – Jan Altink, Dutch painter (died 1971)
 November 14 – Sonia Delaunay, Ukrainian-French artist (died 1979)
 December 25? – Lucienne Heuvelmans, French sculptor (died 1944)
 date unknown – Branko Radulović, Serbian painter (died 1916)

Deaths
 January 20 – Joseph Niklaus Bütler, Swiss painter (born 1822)
 April 18 – Rudolf Eitelberger, Austrian art historian (born 1817)
 April 29 – Ernst Joachim Förster, German painter (born 1800)
 June 12 – Adolf Mosengel, German landscape painter (born 1837)
 June 13 – Carl Arnold Gonzenbach, Swiss painter (born 1806)
 July 23 – Pierre Alexandre Schoenewerk, French sculptor (born 1820)
 August 30 – Thomas Thornycroft, English sculptor (born 1815)
 September 6 – Narcís Monturiol, Spanish artist and engineer (born 1819)
 September 23 – Carl Spitzweg, German painter (born 1808)
 October 9 – John Bowes, English art collector (born 1811)
 December 5 – Wilhelm Ripe, German painter (born 1818)
 December 11 – James Fahey, English landscape painter (born 1804)
 December 30 – Martha Darley Mutrie, British painter (born 1824)
 date unknown'' – Girolamo Masini, Italian sculptor (born 1840)

References

 
Years of the 19th century in art
1880s in art